The Criminal Justice (Scotland) Act 1980 is an Act of Parliament in the United Kingdom (citation 1980 c.62). It decriminalized private homosexual acts between two consenting adults in Scotland when it came into effect on 1 February 1981.

"Subject to the provisions of this section, a homosexual act in private shall not be an offence provided that the parties consent thereto and have attained the age of twenty-one years." (§80:1)

The homosexual age of consent fixed by the Act (21) was much higher than the heterosexual age of consent in the United Kingdom, which had been set at 16 since the Criminal Law Amendment Act 1885. The ages of consent for homosexual and heterosexual acts in Scotland were eventually equalised at 16 with the passage of the Sexual Offences (Amendment) Act 2000.

Passage through Parliament
The amendment to legalise homosexual acts was moved by Robin Cook MP. While moving it, he stated, "The clause bears the names of hon. Members from all three major parties. I regret that the only party represented among Scottish Members of Parliament from which there has been no support for the clause is the Scottish National Party. I am pleased to see both representatives of that party in their place, and I hope to convert them in the remainder of my remarks." When the amendment came to a vote, the SNP's MPs Gordon Wilson and Donald Stewart both voted against the decriminalisation of homosexual acts.

See also

LGBT rights in the United Kingdom
Sexual Offences Act 1967, the Act which decriminalized homosexual acts in England and Wales.
Homosexual Offences (Northern Ireland) Order 1982, the Order in Council which decriminalized homosexual acts in Northern Ireland.

References

External links
 

United Kingdom Acts of Parliament 1980
LGBT law in the United Kingdom
1980 in LGBT history
1980 in Scotland
Acts of the Parliament of the United Kingdom concerning Scotland